Watch the Birdie is a 1950 American comedy film directed by Jack Donohue and starring Red Skelton, Arlene Dahl and Ann Miller.

Plot
Rusty Cammeron is a clumsy photographer in debt who owns a shop with his father and grandfather. After speaking with a customer, Rusty hatches a plan to try to take candid pictures of the rich and famous.

While attempting to photograph heiress Lucia Corlane, Rusty loses his expensive camera. Lucia feels somewhat responsible for the mishap and likes Rusty. She arranges for him to take pictures and film of her business interest, a new housing subdivision called Lucky Vista. Rusty fumbles the assignment but unknowingly films Lucia's estate's manager Grantland Farns and a banker named Shanway discussing their stake in Lucky Vista and how they are going to swindle Lucia.

Rusty snaps publicity photos of the glamorous Miss Lucky Vista, a woman who has been paid by Farns and Shanway to stage a compromising situation with Rusty for Lucia to witness.

Rusty realizes that he has the incriminating film evidence and rushes to rescue Lucia from the crooks and to redeem himself. Rusty and Lucia are chased as they try to reach the police station. On the way, they decide to get married.

Cast
 Red Skelton as Rusty / Pop / Grandpop
 Arlene Dahl as Lucia
 Ann Miller as Miss Lucky Vista
 Leon Ames as Grantland Farns
 Pamela Britton as Mrs. Shanway
 Richard Rober as Mr. Shanway
 Lurene Tuttle as Millie
 Andrew Tombes as Doctor
 Joseph Crehan as Police Captain
 Robert Emmett O'Connor as Policeman
 Kathleen O'Malley as Woman who undresses
 Willard Waterman as Mayor

Production
Red Skelton plays the roles of three generations: the central character, his father and his grandfather. Parts of the film were inspired by the 1928 comedy The Cameraman by Buster Keaton, who was at that point in his career working as a gagman at MGM and advising Skelton.

Clips of the 1940 film Boom Town and the 1941 film Johnny Eager are shown in the film.

Reception
According to MGM records, the film earned $1,318,000 in the U.S. and Canada and $526,000 elsewhere, resulting in a profit of $218,000.

References

External links
 
 

1950 films
1950 comedy films
American comedy films
American black-and-white films
Metro-Goldwyn-Mayer films
Films directed by Jack Donohue
Films about photographers
1950s English-language films
1950s American films